The 1993 UEFA Women's Championship, also referred to as Women's Euro 1993 was a football tournament that happened between 1991 and 1993 (with the qualifying round). The final games was held in Italy. The UEFA Women's Championship is a regular tournament involving European national teams from countries affiliated to UEFA, the European governing body, who have qualified for the competition. The competition aims to determine which national women's team is the best in Europe.

Norway won the competition against Italy who played at home in the final.

Format
In the qualifying round, 23 teams divided into 8 groups (all of 3 teams, except 1 which had two) and the winner of each group would be qualified into the quarter-finals of the Competition. Then teams played a 2-leg knockout round. In the semifinals and final, only one game would be played and the winner of the final would be proclaimed the Champion. The losers of the semifinals would play a Third Place playoff game.

Qualification

Squads
For a list of all squads that played in the final tournament, see 1993 UEFA Women's Championship squads

Bracket

Results

Semifinals

Third place playoff

Final

Awards

Goalscorers
2 goals
  Susan Mackensie

1 goal

  Hanne Nissen
  Maren Meinert
  Heidi Mohr
  Carolina Morace
  Birthe Hegstad
  Anne Nymark Andersen

See also
UEFA Women's Championship
UEFA
Women's football (soccer)

References

External links
Women's Euro 1993 Results – UEFA Official Page

 
Women
1993
1993
1993 in women's association football
1992–93 in Italian women's football
1992–93 in German women's football
1993 in Norwegian women's football
1992–93 in Danish football
June 1993 sports events in Europe
July 1993 sports events in Europe
1993 in Italian women's sport